Gabrielle Lorraine Kessler (born September 14, 1994) is an American former professional soccer player who last played for Houston Dash of the National Women's Soccer League (NWSL). She also played for Portland Thorns FC.

Early years
Kessler was born in Texas, but was raised in Peachtree City, Georgia, alongside her older brother Zack. Kessler was an impressive multi sport athlete.  During high school she was an excellent two-sport athlete in both basketball and soccer. As a basketball player Kessler was a four-year varsity player who broke the all-time scoring record of McIntosh High School with 2003 points.   She was also an excellent soccer player and four year varsity player who made the 2012 NSCAA Girls High School All-America Team and NSCAA Georgia Girls State Player of the Year.  She finished her high school career ranked 11th nationally by TopDrawer Soccer. Kessler ultimately chose to play soccer in college.

College career

University of Georgia, 2013–2014
Kessler started her college career at the University of Georgia. During her two years with the Georgia Bulldogs she made 40 appearances and finished with 10 goals and 11 assists. She was named Georgia's Rookie of the Year in 2013.  She also made the All-SEC First-Year Honor Roll her freshman year. During her sophomore year at Georgia Kessler was named Georgia's Most Valuable player, she was also named to the NSCAA All-South Region second team, the All-SEC First Team, the SEC Academic Honor Roll and was nominated for the MAC Hermann Trophy.

University of Florida, 2015–2017
After two years at Georgia Kessler opted to transfer to the University of Florida, to join former teammate Savannah Jordan. Due to NCAA transfer rules she was forced to sit out, redshirt, her 2015 season. Kessler made her Gators debut in 2016, starting all 23 matches while scoring one goal and providing 2 assists. Her first year as a Gator saw her pick up NSCAA All-South Region first team, All-SEC first team, SEC All-Tournament, SEC Academic Honor Roll and MAC Hermann Trophy watch list selections. She followed this with a senior year that saw her captain the Gators in 23 games and leading the team with eight assists and six goals. She was once again on the MAC Herman Trophy watch list and was named to the USC All-American third team, USC All-Southeast Region first team, All-SEC first team.

Kessler was also selected to play for the Gators women's basketball team for the 2018 season but was unfortunately unable to do so after picking up an injury. She graduated with a bachelor's degree in Telecommunications-Management and a master's degree in Management

Professional career

Portland Thorns, 2019–2021
Kessler was selected in the first round, 9th overall, of the 2018 NWSL College Draft by the Portland Thorns. Kessler however missed the totality of the 2018 season due to rehabilitation to her knee. However, Mark Parson's confidence in her resulted in her making the 2019 Portland Thorns squad. She signed in April 2019 and made her debut for the club on April 20 against the Chicago Red Stars.

Houston Dash, 2021
Kessler scored her first professional goal against the North Carolina Courage on a free kick. She retired from professional soccer in January 2022.

International career
Kessler has been called into several United States Women's National Team camps at the U-18, U-19, U-20 and U-23 levels.

Personal life
She married McClain Kessler on December 18, 2021, and began using her married name Gabby Kessler.

Career statistics 
As of June 3, 2019

References

External links
 NWSL
 Portland Thorns
 Soccerway

1994 births
Living people
People from Peachtree City, Georgia
Sportspeople from the Atlanta metropolitan area
Soccer players from Georgia (U.S. state)
Women's association football defenders
American women's soccer players
Florida Gators women's soccer players
Georgia Bulldogs women's soccer players
Portland Thorns FC draft picks
Portland Thorns FC players
National Women's Soccer League players
Houston Dash players